Amir Gilboa (Hebrew: אמיר גלבע) (born 25 September 1917 –  died 2 September 1984) was an Israeli poet. Gilboa was awarded the Israel Prize for literature in 1982.

Biography
Berl Feldmann (later Amir Gilboa) was born to a Jewish family in Radziwillow (now Radyvyliv, Volhynia) in Ukraine. In 1937, he immigrated to Mandate Palestine. In 1942, he fought in World War II in the Jewish Brigade of the British Army. In 1948, he fought in Israel's Independence War. He died in 1984 at Beilinson Hospital in Petah Tikva due to complications from ischemic heart disease.

Literary career
In 1949, he published a volume of poetry entitled Sheva Reshuyot ("Seven Domains") about his war-time experiences. This collection, along with his Early Morning Songs, published in 1953, established his reputation as a leading Hebrew poet. His early work was influenced by Avraham Shlonsky and Natan Alterman, especially in its use of archaic, biblical Hebrew. Later, his language becomes more colloquial, with an abundance of rhymes, word play and satirical commentary. I Wanted to Write the Lips of Sleepers, published in 1968, is devoted to the act of writing poetry and the poet's feelings.

Awards and recognition

 In 1971, Gilboa was awarded the Bialik Prize for literature.
 In 1982, he was awarded the Israel Prize, for Hebrew poetry.

See also 
List of Israel Prize recipients
List of Bialik Prize recipients

References

1917 births
1984 deaths
Israeli poets
20th-century Israeli Jews
Israeli people of Ukrainian-Jewish descent
Ukrainian Jews
Jewish poets
Israel Prize in Hebrew poetry recipients
20th-century poets
People from Rivne Oblast
Mandatory Palestine military personnel of World War II
Jewish Brigade personnel
Polish emigrants to Mandatory Palestine